Hugo Wilhelm Kauffmann  (7 August 1844 – 30 December 1915) was a German painter, the son of Hermann Kauffmann.

Kauffmann was born in Hamburg. In 1861 he went to Frankfurt and worked there under Jakob Becker, Eduard Jakob von Steinle and Johann Nepomuk Zwerger. From 1863 until 1871 he lived in Kronberg in the Taunus. During this time he spent one winter in Hamburg and a five-month period in Düsseldorf; afterwards he spent 1½ years in Paris, until 1870 when the war drove him out. He lived until 1871 in Munich.

Kauffmann is known mainly for genre paintings, often set in taverns. His paintings are usually small in scale and painted on wood. His work is representative of the Munich School.

He died in Prien at the Chiemsee in 1915.

Gallery

References

1844 births
1915 deaths
19th-century German painters
19th-century German male artists
German male painters
20th-century German painters
20th-century German male artists
Artists from Hamburg